Dugauli Khurd is a village in Khutahan, Jaunpur district, Varanasi division,  Uttar Pradesh, India. Khurd and Kalan are Persian words which mean small and big respectively. When two villages have the same name then they are distinguished as Kalan for the bigger village and Khurd means for the smaller village.

References

Villages in Jaunpur district